Smaragdinomyia is a genus of flies in the family Stratiomyidae.

Species
Smaragdinomyia magnifica (James, 1975)

References

Stratiomyidae
Brachycera genera
Diptera of South America